The Big Three is the nickname of the three most successful sports clubs in Costa Rica. The football teams of Deportivo Saprissa, LD Alajuelense, and CS Herediano have a great rivalry, and are usually the main contenders for the title. Combined they share a total of 86 out of 103 Costa Rican Football Championships ever played and generally end up sharing the top three positions. None of them have been relegated from the Primera División either, having been participants in all editions since 1921.

Several clubs outside the big three have won the Costa Rican league, with CS La Libertad having the fourth-most national titles behind the Big Three in Costa Rica, with six. Today, their chief competitors are CS Cartaginés SG Española and Orión F.C.

See also 
 Big Three (Belgium)
 Big Three (Greece)
 Big Three (Netherlands)
 Big Three (Peru)
 Big Three (Portugal)
 Big Three (Turkey)

References 

Football in Costa Rica
Club Sport Herediano
Deportivo Saprissa
Liga Deportiva Alajuelense